Megh o Roudra (English: Clouds and Sunshine) is a Bengali drama film directed by Arundhati Devi and produced by Ajitesh Bandopadhyay based on Rabindranath Tagore's short story by the same name. This film was released in 1969 under the banner of K.L. Kapur Productions.

Plot
This is the story of Shasibhusan, a young lawyer. After completion of study he lives in a village of British India. Very often a little neighborhood girl Giribala comes to his home for learning. Giribala's father is a landlord. Her family marries her off at her childhood. Shashi never express his untold love to Giribala. He is an educated, courageous and law abiding person who always stands for villagers against the oppression of British administrator. But for whom he struggles for justice they betrayed him before the Court. At the time of trial Shashi become frustrated and imprisoned by the judge. When he returns from the jail, meet Giribala. She became a prosperous widow that time.

Cast
 Swarup Dutta as Shashibhusan
 Nripati Chattopadhyay
 Ajitesh Bandopadhyay as Shashi's father
 Hashu Bannerjee as Giribala
 Prahlad Brahmachari
 Prasad Mukherjee
 Bankim Ghosh
 Monojit Lahiri
 Bhabharup Bhattacharya

References

External links
 

1969 films
Bengali-language Indian films
Films based on short fiction
Indian drama films
Films based on works by Rabindranath Tagore
Indian black-and-white films
1960s Bengali-language films
1969 drama films